The Washington Stealth are a lacrosse team based in Everett, Washington. The team plays in the National Lacrosse League (NLL). The 2012 season was the third season in Washington, and the 13th in franchise history.

Before the season, head coach Chris Hall was diagnosed with throat cancer and missed the entire season. Defensive co-ordinator Art Webster took over head coaching duties for the season.

Regular season

Conference standings

Game log
Reference:

Transactions

Trades

Dispersal Draft
The Stealth chose the following players in the Boston Blazers dispersal draft:

Entry draft
The 2011 NLL Entry Draft took place on September 21, 2011. The Stealth selected the following players:

Roster

See also
2012 NLL season

References

Washington
Washington Stealth seasons
2012 in sports in Washington (state)